Ionad Chaluim Chille Ìle ("The Islay Columba Centre") is a Gaelic medium college on the shores of Loch Indaal, on Islay, in Scotland. Named after Saint Columba (Calum Cille), it was founded in 2002 as part of the University of the Highlands and Islands, and is in a partnership with Sabhal Mòr Ostaig (Skye).

The Centre teaches Gaelic language, culture and heritage by offering Gaelic classes, short courses, and bachelor's degrees through its partnership with SMO. The Centre has a Gaelic library and raises money by renting out rooms. 

It is not to be confused with the similarly-named "Arainn Chaluim Chille", one of the campuses of Sabhal Mòr Ostaig on Skye.

Website
 Ionad Chaluim Chille Ìle

References

University of the Highlands and Islands
Sabhal Mòr Ostaig
Scottish Gaelic education
2002 establishments in Scotland
Educational institutions established in 2002
Education in Argyll and Bute